Farzougha  is a village in the Jebel Akhdar landscape in the Marj District in the northern Cyrenaica region of northeastern Libya.  

Under the Italian occupation it was named Baracca.

Geography

See also
 List of cities in Libya

Notes

Populated places in Marj District
Cyrenaica